Francesco Zugni (1574–1621) was an Italian painter of the late Renaissance period. He was born and active in Brescia. He was a pupil of Palma Giovane. His relationship, if any with Francesco Zugno is unclear
.

References

1574 births
1621 deaths
16th-century Italian painters
Italian male painters
17th-century Italian painters
Mannerist painters
Painters from Brescia